The Bundesagentur für Arbeit (Federal Employment Agency, BA) is a German federal agency in the area of responsibility of the Federal Ministry for Labour and Social Affairs and has its headquarters in Nuremberg. Its current director is Andrea Nahles.

The BA manages job centres across Germany and administers unemployment benefits.

References

External links 
 Bundesagentur für Arbeit (English)

German federal agencies
Public employment service
Employment agencies of Germany